is a Prefectural Natural Park in Nagasaki Prefecture, Japan. The park was established in 1966.

See also
 National Parks of Japan

References

Parks and gardens in Nagasaki Prefecture
Protected areas established in 1966
1966 establishments in Japan